Lynda Ann Cornet (born 26 January 1962 in Leiden, South Holland) is a former international rower from the Netherlands, who won the bronze medal in the Women's Eights at the 1984 Summer Olympics in Los Angeles, California, alongside Marieke van Drogenbroek, Harriet van Ettekoven, Greet Hellemans, Nicolette Hellemans, Martha Laurijsen, Catharina Neelissen, Anne Quist, and Wiljon Vaandrager.

References
 Dutch Olympic Committee

1962 births
Living people
Dutch female rowers
Olympic bronze medalists for the Netherlands
Olympic medalists in rowing
Olympic rowers of the Netherlands
Sportspeople from Leiden
Rowers at the 1984 Summer Olympics
Medalists at the 1984 Summer Olympics